The so-called "Journey Charm" is one of the 12 Anglo-Saxon metrical charms written in Old English. It is a prayer written to summon protection from God and various other Christian figures from the hazards of the road. It is of particular interest as evidence for popular Anglo-Saxon Christian religion.

Content 
A Journey Charm was a Speech Act, or a performative incantation, chant or prayer that was performed before a journey to ward off evil on the journey. It mainly deals with a list of biblical characters, invoking their blessing, including everyone from Adam to Christ to Peter and Paul. The poem reflects the martial character of Anglo-Saxon Christian culture: Luke gives the journeyer a sword, Seraphim give him a "glorious spear of radiant good light", and he is well armed, with mail and shield too. The text gives us a unique insight into popular religious practices of Anglo-Saxon culture, and the particular rituals prescribed for journeys.

History 
The charm survives in only one manuscript: the eleventh-century Cambridge, Corpus Christi College MS 41, where it is written into the margins of pp. 350-53.

This text is part of the movement from Oral Tradition to a Writing tradition, and so is marked as Transitional Literature- a type of go-between in which oral performances are copied, but some of the performance parts are lost, assumed to be inferred, or hinted at.

Facsimiles and Editions
 The manuscript is available in digital facsimile at https://web.archive.org/web/20161018210819/https://parker.stanford.edu/parker/actions/page_turner.do?ms_no=41.

 Foys, Martin et al. Old English Poetry in Facsimile Project (Center for the History of Print and Digital Culture, University of Wisconsin-Madison, 2019-); digital facsimile edition and Modern English translation

References 

Anglo-Saxon metrical charms
Anglo-Saxon society